The New Direction for America was part of the political platform of Congressional Democrats in the 2006 United States congressional elections. It was similar in strategy to the Contract with America of the Republicans in 1994, which gave clear-cut campaign promises six weeks before the crucial 1994 mid-term elections, and was a deciding factor in the ensuing Republican victory.

References

External links
 Minority Leader Nancy Pelosi's Press Release on June 16, 2006

Democratic Party (United States)
Factions in the Democratic Party (United States)